Ignazio Dionisi (born 27 February 1913, date of death unknown) was an Italian ice hockey player. He competed in the men's tournaments at the 1936 Winter Olympics and the 1948 Summer Olympics.

References

External links

1913 births
Year of death missing
Olympic ice hockey players of Italy
Ice hockey players at the 1936 Winter Olympics
Ice hockey players at the 1948 Winter Olympics
Ice hockey people from Milan